"Sun, Moon, Dust" is a 2017 fantasy short story by Ursula Vernon. It was first published in Uncanny Magazine.

Synopsis

Allpa's grandmother bequeaths him a magical sword which, when drawn, invokes three warrior spirits — Sun, Moon, and Dust — who are sworn to aid him in combat. However, Allpa is a potato farmer, and has no need of warriors.

Reception

"Sun, Moon, Dust" was a finalist for the 2018 Hugo Award for Best Short Story.

Apex Magazine called it "sweet [and] quiet", noting that it is "about growth of all kinds". Tangent Online considered it to be a "delight", lauding Vernon's "seamless" exposition, but questioned whether the story's resolution was compatible with the nature of the sword's enchantment. Amal el-Mohtar, who subsequently read the story for Uncannys podcast, stated that it was "kind (and) charming ", and about "the right to not be a warrior".

References

External links
Text of the story

Works by Ursula Vernon
2017 short stories
Fantasy short stories